Clarence Edward "Pete" Carpenter (April 1, 1914 – October 18, 1987) was an American jazz trombonist, arranger, and veteran of television theme music sheet music. After a long career playing the trombone in bands and as a studio musician, Carpenter started working with composer Earle Hagen and writing music for television on shows like Bewitched (1964), Gomer Pyle, U.S.M.C. (1964), and The Andy Griffith Show (1966–1967).

Music
Carpenter's collaboration with the much younger composer Mike Post began in 1968 and lasted until Carpenter's death nearly two decades later. The two saw some success when they wrote the theme for producer Stephen J. Cannell's first show, the police detective drama Toma in 1973. But their big breakthrough was the top 10 Billboard hit and Grammy Award-winning theme for Cannell's private detective drama The Rockford Files in 1974, starring James Garner.

Film and television works
Carpenter and Post went on to score over 1800 hours of television, and to compose the music for television shows like The Rockford Files (1974), CHiPs (1977), Magnum, P.I. (1980), Tenspeed and Brown Shoe (1980), The A-Team (1983), Hardcastle and McCormick (1983), Riptide (1984), Hunter (1984), Stingray (1985), as well as movies like Vanishing Point (1971), Rabbit Test (1978), and Will: G. Gordon Liddy (1982). In addition to their 17th Annual Grammy Awards for Grammy Award for Best Arrangement, Instrumentalist for Rockford, for Hunter the duo won a Broadcast Music, Inc. TV Music Award in 1989.

The theme for The A-Team and The Rockford Files have also made appearances on other television programs and movies, including the pilot for David Chase's hit show on HBO, The Sopranos (1999), and the films Not Another Teen Movie (2001), Dumb and Dumberer: When Harry Met Lloyd (2003), Napoleon Dynamite (2004), and Miracle (2004).

Personal life
Carpenter died of lung cancer in Sherman Oaks, California on October 18, 1987 at the age of 73.  He was married to actress Maybeth Carr, the daughter of silent screen star Mary Carr, and had two children, Pete Jr., and Nancy.

The Magnum, P.I. episode "Innocence... A Broad" was dedicated to him. In 1987, Mike Post and the BMI Foundation established a Pete Carpenter Memorial Fund to benefit young composers.

References

External links

1914 births
1987 deaths
20th-century American composers
20th-century American male musicians
American film score composers
American jazz trombonists
American male film score composers
American television composers
Deaths from lung cancer in California
Emmy Award winners
Grammy Award winners
Male television composers
Male trombonists